Athyma glora is a species of nymphalid butterfly.

Description
The upperside of the wings is black or dark brown, with blue-white markings. It seems quite similar to Athyma cama.

Distribution
This species can be found on Nias Island in Indonesia.

Bibliography
 Kheil, N.M. (1884). Zur Fauna des Indo-Malayischen Archipels. Die Rhoplalocera der Insel Nias Rhopalocera Ins. Nias: [1-5], 6-38, 5pls. Berlin
 The Journal of the Asiatic Society of Bengal

References

Butterflies described in 1884
Athyma
Butterflies of Indonesia